The  Chamber of Audit   is the state auditor of the Government of Bulgaria and directly subordinate of the  National Assembly. It carries out external control of the financial resources and activities in the public sector.

Retrospection 
The National Audit Office of Bulgaria is one of the most important and respected institutions of the restored Bulgarian statehood after the liberation of Bulgaria. During the 1879 Bulgarian Constituent Assembly election, the future national treasure was among the most discussed topics. After all, as early as the 19th century, Bulgaria managed to build one of the most modern such institutions of its time with a court and prosecutor's office regarding the control and disputes over public finances. This system survived throughout the first half of the twentieth century and was abolished by virtue of the so-called Dimitrov Constitution. During this historical period, Bulgaria was one of the most prosperous economic countries, and its currency was among the most valued. 

From the Second World War to the so-called Revolutions of 1989, Bulgaria, following the example of the other countries of the Soviet bloc, did not have an independent supreme audit institution.

Dispute over the model of the restored Bulgarian National Audit Office 
The Constitution of Bulgaria restores the National Audit Office, but its specific model is a matter of fierce and speculative debates as a result of which the law on it until 1996 and the de facto institution was not restored until 1996, despite the requirements of the Constitution. As a result, a political crisis broke out in Bulgaria (1996 – 1997).  In Bulgaria, unprecedented for a relatively developed and cultural country with traditions, a currency board was introduced which will remain for the next 20 years, and the population of Bulgaria will shrink for 35 years from 1985 to 2020 by 2 million or from 9 million to 7 million.

Disputes over anti-corruption model and body 

In early 2015, Meglena Kuneva proposed the creation of a single state body to combat corruption in the context of the consequences of the Great Recession. It is not proposed to abolish the currency board or restore the judicial function of the National Audit Office of Bulgaria. As a result, a fierce dispute erupted with mutual accusations of imposing controversial anti-corruption models with only a rear façade. 

Eventually, a toothless anti-corruption commission was established in 2017, headed by former prosecutor accused of corruption and former chief prosecutor Sotir Tsatsarov.  The activity of this anti-corruption commission is more than scandalous and it is even accused of corrupt practices.

New Constitution 

In the summer of 2020, as a result of the COVID-19 recession, unprecedented 2020–2021 Bulgarian protests broke out in Bulgaria. The ruling majority, in an attempt to quell the riots, has conveniently proposed a new social contract, forgetting that the prime minister has been regularly accused of lacking any financial legitimacy, discipline and control over public finances. Rumen Radev regularly accuses Boyko Borisov of using the state budget as a personal portfolio, a matter that should be under the jurisdiction of the National Audit Office of Bulgaria. 

The new draft constitution of Bulgaria again conveniently forgets to renew the judiciary of the National Audit Office of Bulgaria, which is turned into something like a private accounting firm of the popular Bulgarian politician Delyan Peevski. Apart from that, the National Audit Office should exercise control over the judiciary in Bulgaria, whose budget reaches BGN 1 billion and whose activity is not approved by 90% of Bulgarians.

Notes

External links 
 Official website

Bulgaria
National Assembly (Bulgaria)
Government agencies of Bulgaria
Government agencies established in 1880
Supreme audit institutions
1880 establishments in Bulgaria